La Bandera may refer to:

 La Bandera (film), a 1935 French drama film
 La Bandera (novel), a 1931 novel by Pierre Mac Orlan
 La Bandera station, in Caracas, Venezuela
 La Bandera, a Marvel Comics superheroine
 La Bandera/Tultitlán (Mexibús), a BRT station in Tultitlán, Mexico